Moshaweng is a village in Kweneng District of Botswana. It is located 60 km west of Molepolole. The population of Moshaweng was 974 in 2001 census.

It was the ancient name of Gaborone.

References

Kweneng District
Villages in Botswana